Lycée Jean-Piaget is an institution in Neuchâtel, Switzerland offering secondary education, tertiary education and language education.
In 1998, the business school, l'École supérieure de commerce de Neuchâtel, merged with l'École supérieure Numa-Droz to form Lycée Jean-Piaget.

References

External links
 Lycée Jean-Piaget
  Lycée Jean-Piaget

Neuchâtel
Secondary schools in Switzerland